Elachista vitellina is a moth of the family Elachistidae. It is found all over Australia.

References

Moths described in 2011
vitellina
Moths of Australia